Barbatia barbata is a species of ark clam, a marine bivalve mollusk in the family Arcidae, the ark clams.

Description
The shape of the shell of this common species is quite variable. Usually it is oblong and flattened, with many radial ribs cut by concentric lines. When alive or fresh dead, the shell has a characteristic hairy dark periostracum (hence the Latin name barbata, meaning "bearded"), covering the entire surface of the shell except for the apical part.

Distribution
This ark clam is found along the coasts of the Mediterranean Sea, especially in Greece, Italy and Tunisia.

Habitat
This species lives on rocky or coralligenous (coral-bearing) seabed.

References
Repetto G., Orlando F. & Arduino G. (2005) - Conchiglie del Mediterraneo - Published by Amici del Museo "Federico Eusebio", Alba, Italy
Biolib
WoRMS
Conchiglie veneziane

barbata
Bivalves described in 1758
Taxa named by Carl Linnaeus